Emmanuel Broutin (1826–1883) was a French fencing master, sergeant of the imperial army, emigrated to Spain where he proceeded his career for the queen Isabella II of Spain before managing his fencing hall in Madrid.

Biography

Born in Somain, Nord in 1826, Emmanuel Broutin (named Manuel Jose in Spain) was son of a rope-maker. He joined the army in 1847. He met in Montpellier the famous Jean-Louis Michel, great exponent of the art of fencing in the nineteenth century.

Because of a duel and his adversary belonging Napoleon III's court, he had to leave the French army, at the end of 1863.

Owing to his good relationship in the Spanish community of Paris, he chose Spain as place of exile. In Madrid, he worked for the queen Isabella II during the end of her reign, between 1863 and 1868 and became the future king Alfonso XII of Spain's fencing master. Emmanuel Broutin also reorganized the Royal Cavalry of the East Palace before opening his fencing hall in Madrid.

Married at 31, in Paris, to Marie-Louise Pasquier, dressmaker, he had eleven children. Two of his sons, C. Leon and Achille were fencing masters too.

He died in 1883 in San Sebastián.

References
 Vigeant, Arsène : Un Maître d'Armes sous la Restauration - Paris - 1883
 Broutin, C. Leon : El Arte de la Esgrima - Madrid - 1893
 Szwiec, Nathalie : "Un Duel sous le Second Empire" in Bulletin n°18 de l'Académie du Second Empire - p 103-104 - 2010

External links
Les Maîtres d'Armes Broutin
Fencing, a Bibliography by Henk Pardoel

1826 births
1883 deaths
French male fencers
French emigrants to Spain
Sportspeople from Nord (French department)